The 1995 Korean League Cup, also known as the Adidas Cup 1995, was the fifth competition of the Korean League Cup.

Table

Matches

Awards

Source:

See also
1995 K League

References

External links
Official website
RSSSF

1995
1995
1995 domestic association football cups
1995 in South Korean football